The 2021 Nebraska Cornhuskers baseball team represents the University of Nebraska–Lincoln in the 2021 NCAA Division I baseball season. The Cornhuskers, led by head coach Will Bolt in his second season, are a member of the Big Ten Conference and play their home games at Haymarket Park in Lincoln, Nebraska.

Awards

Big Ten Conference Players of the Week

Conference awards

2021 MLB draft

References

External links 
 Nebraska Baseball 2021 schedule

2021 Big Ten Conference baseball season
2021
2021 in sports in Nebraska
Nebraska
2021